Anna Magdalena Bach (née Wilcke or Wilcken) (22 September 1701 – 27 February 1760) was a professional singer and the second wife of Johann Sebastian Bach.

Biography
Anna Magdalena Wilcke was born at Zeitz, in the Duchy of Saxe-Zeitz.
While little is known about her early musical education, the family was musical. Her father, Johann Caspar Wilcke (c. 1660–1733), was a trumpet player, who had a career at the courts of Zeitz and Weißenfels. Her mother, Margaretha Elisabeth Liebe, was the daughter of an organist.

By 1721 Anna Magdalena was employed as a singer (soprano) at the princely court of Anhalt-Cöthen. Johann Sebastian Bach had been working there as Capellmeister, or director of music, since December 1717. It is possible that he first heard her sing at the ducal court in Weißenfels, where he is known to have performed as early as 1713, when his Hunting Cantata was premiered there.

Anna and Johann married on 3 December 1721, seventeen months after the death of his first wife, Maria Barbara Bach. Later that month, the couple's employer, Leopold, Prince of Anhalt-Köthen, married Frederica Henriette of Anhalt-Bernburg. Bach believed her lack of interest in music caused the musical life at the court to decline, although there is evidence that other factors were involved. There were budgetary constraints caused by Prussian military demands of which Bach may have had limited knowledge because it's unlikely that the prince would have discussed his financial problems with Bach.
Anna Magdalena continued to sing professionally after her marriage. In one notable example of her continuing involvement with music, she returned to Köthen in 1729 to sing at Prince Leopold's funeral.  The Bachs' shared interest in music contributed to their happy marriage. She regularly worked as a copyist, transcribing her husband's music, which she sold as a means to contribute to the family income.  Bach wrote a number of compositions dedicated to her, most notably the two distinct Notebooks for Anna Magdalena Bach. During the Bach family's time in Leipzig, Anna Magdalena organized regular musical evenings featuring the whole family playing and singing together with visiting friends. The Bach house became a musical centre in Leipzig.

Apart from music, her interests included gardening.

Together they raised the children from his first marriage and had 13  of their own from 1723 to 1742, seven of whom died at a young age:

Christiana Sophia Henrietta (spring 1723–29 June 1726)
Gottfried Heinrich (26 February 1724 – 12 February 1763)
Christian Gottlieb (14 April 1725 – 24 August 1728)
Elisabeth Juliana Friederica, called "Liesgen" (5 April 1726 – 24 August 1781), married to Bach's pupil, Johann Christoph Altnickol
Ernestus Andreas (30 October 1727 – 1 November 1727)
Regina Johanna (10 October 1728 – 25 April 1733)
Christiana Benedicta (1 January 1730 – 4 January 1730)
Christiana Dorothea (18 March 1731 – 31 August 1732)
Johann Christoph Friedrich, the 'Bückeburg' Bach (21 June 1732 – 26 January 1795)
Johann August Abraham (5 November 1733 – 6 November 1733)
Johann Christian, the 'London' Bach (5 September 1735 – 1 January 1782)
Johanna Carolina (30 October 1737 – 18 August 1781)
Regina Susanna (22 February 1742 – 14 December 1809)

After Johann Sebastian's death in 1750, his sons came into conflict and moved on in separate directions, going to live with other family members.  While the Bachs ensured their sons were educated, their daughters never went to school.  Anna Magdalena was left alone, with no financial support from family members, to care for herself and her two youngest daughters, plus her stepdaughter from Bach's first marriage. Anna Magdalena became increasingly dependent upon charity and handouts from the city council. Probably her only child or stepchild who provided any support to her was her stepson Carl Philipp Emanuel Bach, whose letters show he provided regular financial assistance. She died on 27 February 1760, with no money at all, and was buried in an unmarked pauper's grave at Leipzig's  (St. John's Church). The church was destroyed by Allied bombing during World War II.

Claim of composership

Recently, it has been suggested that Anna Magdalena Bach composed several musical pieces bearing her husband's name: Professor Martin Jarvis of the School of Music at Charles Darwin University in Darwin, Australia, claims that she composed the famed six cello suites (BWV 1007–1012) and was involved with the composition of the aria from the Goldberg Variations (BWV 988) and the opening prelude of The Well-Tempered Clavier. These ideas were also made into a TV documentary Written by Mrs Bach.

These claims have been virtually unanimously dismissed by Bach scholars and performers. Christoph Wolff said:
When I served as director of the Leipzig Bach Archive from 2001 to 2013, I and my colleagues there extensively refuted the basic premises of the thesis, on grounds of documents, manuscript sources, and musical grounds. There is not a shred of evidence, but Jarvis doesn't give up despite the fact that several years ago, at a Bach conference in Oxford, a room full of serious Bach scholars gave him an embarrassing showdown.

Writing in The Guardian, cellist Steven Isserlis said, "I'm afraid that his theory is pure rubbish," and continued, "How can anybody take this shoddy material seriously?" 

Bach scholar Ruth Tatlow has written a refutation at length, centred on the TV documentary, in the journal Understanding Bach, where she calls Jarvis's claims "flawed and untenable".

Biographical sources
 Geiringer, Karl (1958) Die Musikerfamilie Bach: Leben und Wirken in drei Jahrhunderten. Unter Mitarbeit von Irene Geiringer. München. Beck. 

A fictitious autobiography The Little Chronicle of Magdalena Bach was written in 1925 by the English author Esther Meynell. This sentimental narration of the family life of Bach is not based on any sources and is probably far from the personality of Anna Magdalena Bach.

A compilation of material about Anna Magdalena Bach was published by Maria Hübner in 2005, Anna Magdalena Bach. Ein Leben in Dokumenten und Bildern, completed by a biographical Essay of Hans-Joachim Schulze.

Celebratory cello and dance performance

The Bach Cello Suites Festival, held at New York's Carnegie Hall on 3 March 2020 to commemorate the tercentenary of their composition, highlighted Anna Magdalena's role in helping to immortalise the six suites. Her life was celebrated in a collaborative rendition of the Fifth Suite by cellist Stephanie Winters and dancer-choreographer Julia Bengtsson.

See also
Notebook for Anna Magdalena Bach
The Chronicle of Anna Magdalena Bach – a Straub-Huillet film about Johann Sebastian and Anna Magdalena Bach

Notes and references

External links
Bach-cantatas.com: Anna Magdalena Bach discussions
I am Anna Magdalena Bach.
Bach Cello Suites Festival
Who was Anna Magdalena Bach?

1701 births
1760 deaths
People from Zeitz
People from the Electorate of Saxony
Anna Magdalena Bach
Music copyists
German women singers
Pupils of Johann Sebastian Bach
18th-century German composers